Victory over Japan Day (also known as V-J Day, Victory in the Pacific Day, or V-P Day) is the day on which Imperial Japan surrendered in World War II, in effect bringing the war to an end. The term has been applied to both of the days on which the initial announcement of Japan's surrender was made – 15 August 1945, in Japan, and because of time zone differences, 14 August 1945 (when it was announced in the United States and the rest of the Americas and Eastern Pacific Islands) – as well as to 2 September 1945, when the surrender document was signed, officially ending World War II.

15 August is the official V-J Day for the United Kingdom, while the official US commemoration is 2 September. The name, V-J Day, had been selected by the Allies after they named V-E Day for the victory in Europe.

On 2 September 1945, formal surrender occurred aboard the battleship USS Missouri in Tokyo Bay. This official name was adopted in 1982 by an ordinance issued by the Japanese government.

Surrender

Events before V-J Day
On August 6 and 9, 1945, the Allies dropped atomic bombs on Hiroshima and Nagasaki, respectively. On August 9, the Soviet Union declared war on Japan. The Japanese government on August 10 communicated its intention to surrender under the terms of the Potsdam Declaration.

The news of the Japanese offer began early celebrations around the world. Allied soldiers in London danced in a conga line on Regent Street. Americans and Frenchmen in Paris paraded on the Champs-Élysées singing "Don't Fence Me In". American soldiers in occupied Berlin shouted "It's over in the Pacific", and hoped that they would now not be transferred there to fight the Japanese. Germans stated that the Japanese were wise enough to—unlike themselves—give up in a hopeless situation, and were grateful that the atomic bomb was not ready in time to be used against them. Moscow newspapers briefly reported on the atomic bombings with no commentary of any kind. While "Russians and foreigners alike could hardly talk about anything else", the Soviet government refused to make any statements on the bombs' implication for politics or science.

In Chungking, Chinese fired firecrackers and "almost buried [Americans] in gratitude". In Manila, residents sang "God Bless America". On Okinawa, six men were killed and dozens were wounded as American soldiers "took every weapon within reach and started firing into the sky" to celebrate; ships sounded general quarters and fired anti-aircraft guns as their crews believed that a kamikaze attack was occurring. On Tinian island, B-29 crews preparing for their next mission over Japan were told that it was cancelled, but that they could not celebrate because it might be rescheduled.

Japan's acceptance of the Potsdam Declaration
A little after noon Japan Standard Time on August 15, 1945, Emperor Hirohito's announcement of Japan's acceptance of the terms of the Potsdam Declaration was broadcast to the Japanese people over the radio. Earlier the same day, the Japanese government had broadcast an announcement over Radio Tokyo that "acceptance of the Potsdam Proclamation [would be] coming soon", and had advised the Allies of the surrender by sending a cable to U.S. President Harry S Truman via the Swiss diplomatic mission in Washington, D.C. A nationwide broadcast by Truman was aired at seven o'clock p.m. (daylight time in Washington, D.C.) on Tuesday, August 14, announcing the communication and that the formal event was scheduled for September 2. In his announcement of Japan's surrender on August 14, Truman said that "the proclamation of V-J Day must wait upon the formal signing of the surrender terms by Japan".

Since the European Axis Powers had surrendered three months earlier (V-E Day), V-J Day was the effective end of World War II, although a peace treaty between Japan and most of the Allies was not signed until 1952, and between Japan and the Soviet Union until 1956. In Australia, the name V-P Day (Victory in the Pacific) was used from the outset. The Canberra Times of August 14, 1945, refers to V-P Day celebrations, and a public holiday for V-P Day was gazetted by the government in that year according to the Australian War Memorial.

Public celebrations
After news of the Japanese acceptance and before Truman's announcement, civilians began celebrating "as if joy had been rationed and saved up for the three years, eight months and seven days since Sunday, Dec. 7, 1941" (the day of the Japanese attack on Pearl Harbor), Life magazine reported. In Washington, D.C. a crowd attempted to break into the White House grounds as they shouted "We want Harry!"

In San Francisco two nude women jumped into a pond at the Civic Center to soldiers' cheers. More seriously, thousands of drunken people, the vast majority of them Navy enlistees who had not served in the war theatre, embarked in what the San Francisco Chronicle summarized in 2015 as "a three-night orgy of vandalism, looting, assault, robbery, rape and murder" and "the deadliest riots in the city's history", with more than 1,000 people injured, 13 killed, and at least six women raped. None of these acts resulted in serious criminal charges, and no civilian or military official was sanctioned, leading the Chronicle to conclude that "the city simply tried to pretend the riots never happened".

The largest crowd in the history of New York City's Times Square gathered to celebrate. The victory itself was announced by a headline on the "zipper" news ticker at One Times Square, which read "OFFICIAL *** TRUMAN ANNOUNCES JAPANESE SURRENDER ***"; the six asterisks represented the branches of the U.S. Armed Forces. In the Garment District, workers threw out cloth scraps and ticker tape, leaving a pile five inches deep on the streets. The news of the war's end sparked a "coast-to-coast frenzy of [servicemen] kissing . . . everyone in skirts that happened along," with Life publishing photographs of such kisses in Washington, Kansas City, Los Angeles, and Miami.

Famous photographs

One of the best-known kisses that day appeared in V-J Day in Times Square, one of the most famous photographs ever published by Life. It was shot on August 14, 1945, shortly after the announcement by President Truman occurred and people began to gather in celebration. Alfred Eisenstaedt went to Times Square to take candid photographs and spotted a sailor who "grabbed something in white. And I stood there, and they kissed. And I snapped four times." The same moment was captured in a very similar photograph by Navy photographer Victor Jorgensen (right), published in the New York Times. Several people have since claimed to be the sailor or the female, who was long assumed to be a nurse. It has since been established that the woman in the Alfred Eisenstaedt photograph was actually a dental assistant named Greta Zimmer Friedman, who clarified in a later interview that "it wasn't my choice to be kissed. The guy just came over and kissed or grabbed.".

Another famous photograph is that of the Dancing Man in Elizabeth Street, Sydney, captured by a press photographer and a Movietone newsreel. The film and stills from it have taken on iconic status in Australian history and culture as a symbol of victory in the war.

Japanese reaction

On August 15 and 16, some Japanese soldiers, devastated by the surrender, committed suicide. Well over 100 American prisoners of war were also murdered. In addition, many Australian and British prisoners of war were murdered in Borneo, at both Ranau and Sandakan, by the Imperial Japanese Army. At Batu Lintang camp, also in Borneo, death orders were found which proposed the murder of some 2,000 POWs and civilian internees on September 15, 1945, but the camp was liberated four days before these orders were due to be carried out.  Japanese forces remained in combat with Soviet forces on several fronts for two weeks following VJ-Day.

Ceremony aboard USS Missouri
The formal signing of the Japanese Instrument of Surrender took place on board the battleship  in Tokyo Bay on September 2, 1945, and at that time Truman declared September 2 to be the official V-J Day.

Chronology

 April 1 – June 21, 1945: Battle of Okinawa. 82,000+ US military casualties, and 117,000+ Japanese and Okinawan. Approximately one-fourth of the Okinawan civilian population died, often in mass suicides organized by the Imperial Japanese Army.
 July 26: The Potsdam Declaration is issued. Truman tells Japan, "Surrender or suffer prompt and utter destruction."
 July 29: Japan rejects the Potsdam Declaration.
 August 2: The Potsdam Conference ends.
 August 6: The US drops an atomic bomb, Little Boy, on Hiroshima. In a press release 16 hours later, Truman warns Japan to surrender or "expect a rain of ruin from the air, the like of which has never been seen on this earth."
 August 9: The USSR declares war on Japan, and invades several Japanese-held territories. The US drops another atomic bomb, Fat Man, on Nagasaki.
 August 10: At the direction of the Emperor, the Japanese Foreign Ministry notifies the Allies (via Swiss diplomatic channels) of Japan's intention to surrender unconditionally in accordance with the terms of the Potsdam Declaration, providing the Emperor be permitted to remain in place.
 August 11: The Allies notify the Japanese government (again via Swiss diplomats) of their willingness to accept Japan's surrender as offered.
 August 14: Allied governments announce the surrender of Japan, and the Emperor informs his people of the fact in an unprecedented radio broadcast. The date is described as "V-J Day" or "V-P Day" in newspapers in the United States, United Kingdom, Australia, New Zealand, and Canada.
 September 2: Official surrender ceremony is held aboard  in Tokyo Bay; President Truman declares September 2 as the official "V-J Day".
 November 1: Scheduled commencement of Operation Olympic, the planned Allied invasion of Kyushu.
 March 1, 1946: Scheduled commencement of Operation Coronet, the planned Allied invasion of Honshu.
 September 8, 1951: 48 countries including Japan and most of the Allies sign the Treaty of San Francisco
 April 28, 1952: The Treaty of San Francisco goes into effect, formally ending the state of war between Japan and most of the Allied countries.

Post war:
 Some Japanese soldiers continued to fight on isolated Pacific islands until at least the 1970s, with the last known Japanese soldier surrendering in 1974.

Commemoration

Australia

On 15 August 1945 Australian Prime Minister Ben Chifley announced on radio that Japan had unconditionally surrendered to allied forces. This day, which has become known as VP Day, was marked with jubilant celebrations across the nation as citizens looked towards a future free of conflict and fear of invasion. To manage celebrations authorities closed pubs, as they had on VE Day.  However, this did not dissuade individuals from partying, with crowds gathering in streets and strangers dancing together in city squares.

In Australia, many use the term "VP Day" in preference to "VJ Day", but in the publication The Sixth Year of War in Pictures published by The Sun News-Pictorial in 1946, the term "VJ Day" is used on pages 250 and 251. Also an Australian Government 50th Anniversary Medal issued in 1995 has "VJ-Day" stamped on it.

Amateur radio
Amateur radio operators in Australia hold the "Remembrance Day Contest" on the weekend nearest VP Day, August 15, remembering amateur radio operators who died during World War II and to encourage friendly participation and help improve the operating skills of participants. The contest runs for 24 hours, from 0800 UTC on the Saturday, preceded by a broadcast including a speech by a dignitary or notable Australian (such as the Prime Minister of Australia, Governor-General of Australia, or a military leader) and the reading of the names of amateur radio operators who are known to have died. It is organized by the Wireless Institute of Australia, with operators in each Australian state contacting operators in other states, New Zealand, and Papua New Guinea. A trophy is awarded to the state that can boast the greatest rate of participation, based on a formula including: number of operators, number of contacts made, and radio frequency bands used.

China

As the final official surrender of Japan was accepted aboard the battleship USS Missouri in Tokyo Bay on September 2, 1945, the Nationalist Government of the Republic of China, which represented China on the Missouri, announced three-day holidays to celebrate V-J Day, starting September 3. Starting from 1946, September 3 was celebrated as "Victory of War of Resistance against Japan Day", which evolved into the Armed Forces Day in 1955. September 3 is recognized as V-J Day in mainland China.

Hong Kong

Hong Kong was handed over by the Imperial Japanese Army to the Royal Navy on August 30, 1945, and resumed its pre-war status as a British dependency. Hong Kong celebrated the "Liberation Day" on August 30 (later moved to the Saturday preceding the last Monday in August) annually, which was a public holiday before 1997. After the transfer of sovereignty in 1997, the celebration was moved to the third Monday in August and renamed "Sino-Japanese War Victory Day", the Chinese name of which is literally "Victory of War of Resistance against Japan Day" as in the rest of China, but this day was removed from the list of public holidays in 1999. In 2014, the Chief Executive's Office announced that a commemoration ceremony would be held on September 3, in line with the "Victory Day of the Chinese people's war of resistance against Japanese aggression" in mainland China.

Korea
Gwangbokjeol, (meaning "the day the light returned") celebrated annually on August 15, is a public holiday in South Korea. It commemorates Victory over Japan Day, which liberated Korea from Japanese rule. The day is also celebrated as a public holiday, Liberation Day, in North Korea, and is the only public holiday celebrated in both Koreas.

Mongolia

Victory over Japan Day is celebrated with duality in Mongolia. It also celebrates the victory of Soviet and Mongolian forces in the Battles of Khalkhin Gol. The anniversary of the battle was first celebrated in 1969, and was periodically celebrated on a massive scale every 5 years until its 50th anniversary in 1989, after which it dwindled in importance and was reduced to the level of academic debates and lectures. It was only recently that the anniversary made a resurgence in Mongolian history. It is jointly celebrated by the Mongolian Armed Forces with the Russian Armed Forces. During the 70th, 75th and 80th anniversaries in 2009, 2014 and 2019 respectively, the President of Russia has taken part in the celebrations alongside the President of Mongolia as part of the former's state visit to the Mongolian capital.

Netherlands

The Netherlands has one national and several regional or local remembrance services on or around August 15. The national service is at the "Indisch monument" (Dutch for "Indies Monument") in The Hague, where the victims of the Japanese occupation of the Dutch East Indies are remembered, usually in the presence of the head of state and the government. In total, there are about 20 services, also in the Indies remembrance center in Bronbeek in Arnhem. The Japanese occupation meant the twilight of Dutch colonial rule over Indonesia. Indonesia declared itself independent on August 17, 1945, just two days after the Japanese surrendered. The Indonesian War of Independence lasted until 1949, with the Netherlands recognizing Indonesian sovereignty in late December of that year.

Vietnam
On the day of the surrender of Japan, Hồ Chí Minh declared an independent Democratic Republic of Vietnam.

Vietnam celebrated 19 August as V-J Day, because of the victory of August Revolution against the Japanese forces.

Philippines
In the Philippines, V-J Day is celebrated annually on September 3 and is called the "Surrender of General Tomoyuki Yamashita Day".
The province of Ifugao has observed every September 2 as "Victory Day", commemorating the valor of Philippine war veterans and the informal surrender of General Yamashita to the joint Filipino-American troops led-by Cpt. Grisham in the municipality of Kiangan on September 2, 1945.

Russia/Former USSR
It was introduced as a holiday by decree of the Presidium of the Supreme Soviet of the Soviet Union on September 3, 1945 (the day after the surrender of Japan). The only celebration that was held in the days that followed was a parade of the Red Army in Harbin. In 1945 and 1946, this day was a national holiday. In subsequent years, it became a working day and no celebrations were held on this occasion. In modern Russia, Victory over Japan Day is considered a memorable date and is celebrated as one of many Days of Military Honour. In recent years such as in 2017, bills in the State Duma have proposed making it a national holiday.

A military parade of the Eastern Military District is annually held in the cities of Yuzhno-Sakhalinsk or Khabarovsk, being one of the only parades being held on this day. Parades have also been held on September 2 in the federal subjects of Russia that celebrate the anniversary of the Battles of Khalkhin Gol, such as Buryatia, Yakutia and the Altai Republic. In the breakaway Moldovan-republic of Transnistria, Victory over Japan Day is jointly celebrated with their Republic Day celebrations, which take place on the same day.

United States

Although September 2 is the designated "V-J Day" in the entire United States, the event is not an official federal or state holiday. Rhode Island celebrates the ending of WW2 as "Victory Day", and it is observed on the second Monday of August.

V-J Day was initially commemorated throughout the United States every year on September 2, beginning in 1948, but as the war faded from memory so has the holiday. According to WPRI-TV, the reason for abolishing V-J Day was economic, because workers got a paid day off. There was even a debate over whether or not even Rhode Island would abolish their own Victory Day celebrations. Some towns in various states still celebrate V-J day. Moosup, Connecticut holds an annual V-J day parade on the 2nd Sunday in August, and holds the distinction of being the oldest continuous parade celebrating V-J day since the actual surrender of the Japanese in 1945. Arkansas was the only other state to make the holiday official statewide, but it abolished it in 1975, leaving Rhode Island as the only remaining state.

World Peace Day
It was suggested in the 1960s to declare September 2, the anniversary of the end of World War II, as an international holiday to be called World Peace Day. However, when this holiday came to be first celebrated beginning in 1981, it was designated as September 21, the day the General Assembly of the United Nations begins its deliberations each year.

See also

 Japanese holdouts
 Mokusatsu
 Kyūjō incident
 Retrocession Day, in Taiwan (ROC)
 Stunde Null
 Robert Trout, first American newsman to announce the Japanese surrender

Notes

References

External links

 Original Document: Surrender of Japan
 The U.S. Army in Post-WWII Japan
 V-J Day portal  at the US Army Center of Military History
 VJ Day in New Zealand
 RAW: Russia's Kamchatka commemorates 70th anniversary of victory in WWII
 UK - 50th Anniversary Of VJ Day Festivities
 Australia - Victory in the Pacific rituals

1945 in Japan
Surrender of Japan
Aftermath of World War II
Aftermath of World War II in the United States
August observances
Over Japan
Japan–United States relations
Aftermath of World War II in Japan
1945 in Asia
September observances
August 1945 events
September 1945 events